Cherokee Run is a stream in the U.S. state of Ohio.

Cherokee Run was named for a Cherokee Indian who settled in the area.

Location

Mouth: Confluence with Cherokee Mans Run in Logan County 
Origin: Logan County

See also
List of rivers of Ohio

References

Rivers of Logan County, Ohio
Rivers of Ohio